The IWRG 18th Anniversary Show was an annual professional wrestling major event produced by Mexican professional wrestling promotion International Wrestling Revolution Group (IWRG), which took place on January 1, 2014 in Arena Naucalpan, Naucalpan, State of Mexico, Mexico. The show commemorated the creation of the IWRG 18 years prior on January 1, 1996 when Adolfo "Pirata" Moreno took over running the wrestling in Arena Naucalpan and turned it into the IWRG. The main event featured the team of Lizmark, Jr., Vampiro Canadiense and Villano IV, three established wrestlers who had not worked for IWRG on a regular basis prior to the show taking on three IWRG full-time wrestlers in the team of Cien Caras, Jr., Super Nova and X-Fly. The show featured four additional matches.

Production

Background
The 2014 International Wrestling Revolution Group (IWRG; Sometimes referred to as Grupo Internacional Revolución in Spanish) anniversary show commemorated the 18th anniversary of IWRG's creation as a wrestling promotion and holding their first show on January 1, 1996. The Anniversary show, as well as the majority of the IWRG shows in general are held in "Arena Naucalpan", owned by the promoters of IWRG and their main arena. The Anniversary Shows generally take place on January 1 each year whenever possible.

Storylines
The event featured five professional wrestling matches with different wrestlers involved in pre-existing scripted feuds, plots and storylines. Wrestlers were portrayed as either heels (referred to as rudos in Mexico, those that portray the "bad guys") or faces (técnicos in Mexico, the "good guy" characters) as they followed a series of tension-building events, which culminated in a wrestling match or series of matches.

Results

References

External links 
IWRG official website

2014 in professional wrestling
2014 in Mexico
18
January 2014 events in Mexico